Kisses and Caroms is a 2006 American independent comedy film that was shot in five days for a budget of $11,000, which went on to gross over $1 million through Warner Bros. The film is available in Greece, Russia, Hong Kong, Thailand, and Brazil. It was also released by 20th Century Fox under the title American Pool in Australia and New Zealand.

Plot
Jen and Tara arrange a threesome to win Jen's ex-boyfriend back, but things don't go quite as planned. He still believes their relationship is best left as friends. Through the antics of offbeat characters at the billiard pro shop where they all work, he comes to realize Jen is his dream girl, but is it too late?

References

External links

Kisses and Caroms on Myspace

2006 films
2000s sex comedy films
2000s English-language films
Films about threesomes
American independent films
American sex comedy films
Warner Bros. films
Cue sports films
2006 comedy films
2000s American films